Richard C. E. C. Dunn (born 8 March 1976) is a British rower. He won a gold medal at the 2001 World Rowing Championships in Lucerne with the men's coxless four. He represented Great Britain at the 2004 Summer Olympics in the coxless pair, where he came seventh with Toby Garbett.

References

1976 births
Living people
British male rowers
World Rowing Championships medalists for Great Britain
Olympic rowers of Great Britain
Rowers at the 2004 Summer Olympics